The Norway Point Formation is a geologic formation in Michigan. It preserves fossils dating back to the middle Devonian period.

Fossil content

Vertebrates

Invertebrates

See also

 List of fossiliferous stratigraphic units in Michigan

References

 

Devonian Michigan
Devonian southern paleotemperate deposits